Huntington Castle, also known as Clonegal Castle, is a castle in  Clonegal, County Carlow, Ireland, built in 1625.

The structure was originally a "plantation castle", used for defensive purposes during the plantation of the area in the early 17th century. The original tower house, which served as a garrison, was built in the 15th century as a stronghold for the Caviness family, an old Irish clan. Later Baron Esmonde. Due to the strategic importance of the village of Clonegal during the Cromwellian conquest of Ireland because of its location on the road between Dublin and Wexford, the castle was captured by Oliver Cromwell as he marched on Kilkenny in 1650.

It is now a private house open to the public for guided tours throughout June, July, August and September. It was the setting for Stanley Kubrick's film Barry Lyndon. Its basement has been the base of a religion, the Fellowship of Isis, since 1976,  The castle hosted the Solas Festival in August 2008. co-founded by Olivia Robertson, her brother Lawrence Durdin-Robertson and his wife Pamela. The castle is now owned by Alexander and Claire Durdin Robertson.

Gardens

The Esmonde family laid out most of the gardens in the 17th century. This includes the French limes on the Avenue, the parterre or lawns to the side of the house, the fish ponds on either side of the centre walk through the wilderness and the majority of yew trees which comprise the Yew Walk. Larger plantings have resulted in Huntington possessing a number of great Irish trees, including varieties of hickory, a cut leaved oak, Siberian crab and buckeye chestnut. A lake at the bottom of the wilderness was built for ornamental purposes but next to it is one of the earliest water turbine houses in Ireland, providing Huntington with its own electricity as early as 1888. The River Derry, which forms the boundary between Counties Wexford and Carlow, flows along the bottom of the wilderness, providing a pleasant setting for woodland walks.

Ghosts
There have been various myths that Huntington castle has been plagued by ghosts of druids in the fields and even in the castle. It is said that the druids could, at a stroke, create a mist; start fires at will; and bring down showers of blood. They were feared because they would sacrifice men and women to please their gods.

See also
List of country houses in County Carlow

References

External links 
 Huntington Castle's website
Holiday accommodation at Huntington Castle

Castles in County Carlow
Buildings and structures in County Carlow